Sulpicia Dryantilla (died 260/261) was the wife of Regalianus, Roman usurper against Gallienus. Regalianus gave her the title of Augusta to legitimize his claim. Virtually nothing is known of her except that she was the daughter of Claudia Ammiana Dryantilla and Sulpicius Pollio, an accomplished senator and officer under Caracalla. She most likely died in 260/261 along with her husband, when he was killed by a coalition of his own people and the Rhoxolani.

Sources
Morris, John, Arnold Hugh Martin Jones and John Robert Martindale, The prosopography of the later Roman Empire, Cambridge University Press, 1992, p. 273.

3rd-century births
Crisis of the Third Century
3rd-century Roman women
Augustae
Sulpicii